Glycine amidinotransferase, mitochondrial is an enzyme that in humans is encoded by the GATM gene.

This gene encodes a mitochondrial enzyme that belongs to the Amidinotransferase family. This enzyme is involved in creatine biosynthesis, whereby it catalyzes the transfer of a guanido group from L-arginine to glycine, resulting in guanidinoacetic acid, the immediate precursor of creatine. Mutations in this gene cause arginine:glycine amidinotransferase deficiency, an inborn error of creatine synthesis characterized by mental retardation, language impairment, and behavioral disorders.

References

Further reading

External links
 GeneReviews/NCBI/NIH/UW entry on Creatine Deficiency Syndromes